The 1973 Algerian Cup Final was the 11th final of the Algerian Cup. The final took place on June 19, 1973, at Stade 5 Juillet 1962 in Algiers with kick-off at 21:00. MC Alger beat USM Alger 4–2 after extra time to win their second Algerian Cup.

Pre-match

Details

References

Cup
Algeria
Algerian Cup Finals
USM Alger matches